The Carlos Palanca Memorial Awards for Literature winners in 1963 (rank, title of winning entry, name of author).


English division
Short story
 First prize: "A Record of My Passage" by Juan Gatbunton
 Second prize: "The Taste of Dust" by Leopoldo N. Cacnio
 Third prize: "Mabuhay, My Country, My Lovely People" by Alma De Jesus

One-act play
 First prize: "Turn Red the Sea" by Wilfrido D. Nolledo
 Second prize: "Tubig" by Estrella D. Alfon
 Third prize: "The Executives" by Julian E. Dacanay Jr.

Filipino division

Short story
 First prize: "Himaymay" by Buenaventura S. Medina Jr.
 Second prize: "Tata Selo" by Rogelio Sicat
 Third prize: "Sa Bagong Paraiso" by Efren R. Abueg

One-act play
 First prize: "Huling Kahilingan" by Benjamin P. Pascual
 Second prize: "Nakalipad ang Ibon" by Gregorio A. Moral Jr.
 Third prize: "Mukha ni Medusa" by Mar V. Puatu

References
 

Palanca Awards
1963 literary awards